Convolvulus arvensis, the field bindweed, is a species of bindweed that is rhizomatous and is in the morning glory family (Convolvulaceae), native to Europe and Asia. It is a climbing or creeping herbaceous perennial plant with stems growing to 0.5–2 metres in length, usually found at ground level, with small, white and pink flowers.

Other common names, mostly obsolete, include lesser bindweed, European bindweed, withy wind (in basket willow crops), perennial morning glory, small-flowered morning glory, creeping jenny, and possession vine.

Taxonomy
This plant first gained its scientific name in 1753, when it was described by Linnaeus in the Species Plantarum. In the centuries afterwards it gained many subspecies and varieties across its vast range, as well as synonyms as purportedly new species were described from places like China, Russia, Egypt or Morocco. New species and forms were even described from areas like Chile, Mexico and California when botanists encountered the plant there, although it is not native to these areas.

In the ninth volume of Augustin Pyramus de Candolle's Prodromus, published in 1845, Jacques Denys Choisy reduced a number of these synonyms to ten varieties of Convolvulus arvensis, although he also recognised a number of species now also reduced to synonyms of C. arvensis. Over time, most or all of these species and varieties were no longer recognised by the relevant authorities.

In the 2009 Flora of Great Britain and Ireland, Peter Derek Sell described nine new forms he believed he had discovered in Cambridgeshire, especially along Fen Road in the village of Bassingbourn cum Kneesworth. The incredible bindweed biodiversity of Bassingbourn cum Kneesworth was not deemed credible by subsequent taxonomists, however, and the species is currently considered to be monotypic by most authorities.

Description
Convolvulus arvensis is a perennial vine. It will climb to some one metre high. Underground the vine produces more or less woody rhizomes, from which it re-sprouts in the spring, or when the above ground vines are removed.

The leaves are spirally arranged, linear to arrowhead-shaped, 2–5 cm long and alternate, with a 1–3 cm petiole. The flowers are trumpet-shaped, 1–2.5 cm diameter, white or pale pink, with five slightly darker pink radial stripes. Flowering occurs in the mid-summer, (in the UK, between June and September,) when white to pale pink, funnel-shaped flowers develop. Flowers are approximately 0.75–1 in (1.9–2.5 cm) across and are subtended by small bracts. Each fruit contains 2 or 4 seeds that are eaten by birds and can remain viable in the soil for decades. The stems climb by twisting around other plant stems in a counter-clockwise direction.

Similar species
Convolvulus arvensis can be confused with a number of similar weed species. Key traits are the small flowers often crowded together, and two sharp, backwards-pointed lobes at the base of the usually arrow-shaped leaf ending in a sharp apex. Juvenile stems exude a milky sap when broken.
Calystegia sepium - Large white flowers. Squarish or rounded lobes at the base of the leaf.
C. spithamaea - Leaf apex is rounded. Large white flowers. Only occurs in America.
Fagopyrum tataricum - Annual. No milky sap.
Fallopia convolvulus - Small greenish flowers. No milky sap.
Ipomoea spp. - Ornamental species are summer annuals. More rounded, heart-shaped leaves in most species.

In China, the most similar and only other vinaceous Convolvulus species is C. steppicola (most of the Convolvulus species are shrubs or herbaceous perennials), however this species has a thick woody rootstock, almost no petioles, and only grows in northern Yunnan, where C. arvensis is absent.

Ecology
Plants are typically found inhabiting farmland, waste places, along roads, in pastures, grassy slopes, and also along streams in North America. It is able to colonise hot asphalt surface by covering it from the sides of roads, and worm its way between pavement stones. It grows from 600 to 4500 metres in altitude in China, and is absent from the warmer southern provinces. It prefers dry areas with humus-poor, nutrient-rich and alkaline soils. It is a characteristic species in the phytosociological vegetation association Convolvulo-Agropyretum, belonging to the couch grass dry grasslands alliance (called Convolvulo-Agropyrion repentis in syntaxonomy).

Like the other Convolvulus bindweeds of Eurasia, it is specifically pollinated by sweat bees in the genus Systropha. These are specialists (oligolectic) feeding upon the flowers of these plants, possessing unusual modifications of the scopa, such that almost the entire abdomen (including the dorsal surface) is used for carrying pollen, rather than the legs, as in most bees. Species of Systropha in central Europe (such as S. curvicornis and S. planidens, both uncommon bees) are essentially entirely dependent upon C. arvensis. Although both species specialise on the same plant species, S. curvicornis is a habitat generalist while S. planidens is only found in steppe habitats, although they are also found occurring together. The males of both species claim territories consisting of a patch of bindweed flowers, perching on the flowers in the afternoon after a regular patrol of their little patch for errant conspecific males, which, upon countenance, they proceed to attack the intruder by ramming him from the air with a specialised protuberance on their lower abdomen. Sometimes bumblebees, honey bees or other insects are air-bombed, but never rammed. The males retreat inside the flower after the perching session, as it closes in the late afternoon, spending the night inside the flower and escaping at dawn before or after it fully closes (the females stay in underground tunnel nests). The males only land on flowers (sometimes of other plants), eschewing other perches, and feed on the nectar. Females forage for nectar and pollen in the morning and early afternoon while flowers stay open. Most copulation occurs in bindweed flowers: when a virgin female wanders into their patch, and the larger males find them busy at one of their flowers during morning patrol, the males pounce upon them without ado and immediately establish contact with their mutual genitalia, getting the job done on average 90 seconds later. These species are themselves specifically parasitised upon by the cuckoo bee Biastes brevicornis.

As an invasive
Outside its native range, field bindweed does not appear to be a significant threat to natural habitats. It primarily requires disturbed ground (agricultural land), and is easily shaded out by taller shrubs and trees. It may dominate the ground flora in some low quality, open grassland areas, however. In North America it can become the or a co-dominant plant in specific habitats: the low vegetation found around vernal pools in Sacramento County, and around large pools in Tehama County, California; riparian corridors in Wyoming and Colorado; aspen stands and mountain-mahogany (Cercocarpus spp.) shrubland/grassland in Colorado; and disturbed riverbank areas in the Montreal area of Canada. In some nature parks, it is commonly found in areas of disturbed soil, such as camp grounds or around horse corrals in California. Similarly, the report of its invasive character from Colorado is from former agricultural land being restored to a more natural state by The Nature Conservancy. Employees for the same organisation also reported that it was a significant weed on an irrigated plot of farmland in northern Idaho where native bunchgrass and forbs were cultivated, insofar that it caused "decreasing biodiversity" on the land.

It is thought to have little effect on native fauna, although it may sometime be eaten by farm livestock. It may cause photosensitisation in susceptible animals. There is a report of its roots (rhizomes) being possibly poisonous to pigs. and the alkaloids it contains may be poisonous to horses in sufficient amounts. There are also reports of it being eaten by sheep and pigs to control it without reported problems.

Chemistry
Bindweed contains several alkaloids which are toxic for mice, including pseudotropine, and lesser amounts of tropine, tropinone, and meso-cuscohygrine.

Economic impacts
Although it produces attractive flowers, it is often unwelcome in gardens as a nuisance weed due to its rapid growth and choking of cultivated plants. It was most likely introduced into North America as a contaminant in crop seed as early as 1739, and became an invasive species. Its dense mats invade agricultural fields and reduce crop yields; it is estimated that crop losses due to this plant in the United States exceeded US$377 million in the year 1998 alone. It is one of the most serious weeds of agricultural fields in many temperate regions of the US.

Control and management
Bindweed is difficult to eliminate. Roots may extend as far as nine feet deep, according to one source, or 30 feet, according to another. New plants may sprout from seeds that are up to 20 years old. New plants can also form from root runners and root fragments.

Methods for controlling bindweed include:

 Physical removal: Bindweed can be controlled by pulling it out by hand or plowing it up every three weeks, for three up to seven years.
 Mulching: Applying a thick barrier to block sun may control bindweed.
 Soil solarization for six to nine weeks in California was found to kill seedlings entirely, and control adult plants, but only for three weeks after treatment.
 Boiling water, placed on the plant, only practical for small areas.
 Biological control: Some insects and mites can eat, distort or stunt bindweed, but do not fully control it.
 Grazing: In Minnesota, sheep are able to consistently completely rid an infested pasture of the bindweed in two seasons, but only when the pasture is used to grow annual grains.
 In general, plant species which grow vigorously in the winter and early spring are best at smothering emerging shoots.
 It can be controlled by glyphosate.
 Other herbicides usually recommended for this species are 2,4-D, dicamba, picloram, quinclorac and paraquat.

In culture
In one of the tales collected by Jacob and Wilhelm Grimm, Our Lady's Little Glass, this flower is used by Mary, mother of Jesus, to drink wine with when she helps free a wagoner's cart. The story goes on to say that "the little flower is still always called Our Lady's Little Glass".

References 

Flora Europaea: Convolvulus arvensis
Invasive.org: Convolvulus arvensis
PLANTS Profile: Convolvulus arvensis (field blindweed) | USDA PLANTS
Federal Noxious Weed Disseminules in the US

External links
 
 
 Maltawildplants.com

arvensis
Flora of Asia
Flora of Europe
Medicinal plants of Asia
Medicinal plants of Europe
Plants described in 1753
Taxa named by Carl Linnaeus